Jean Grellier (born 17 May 1947 in Moncoutant) is a member of the National Assembly of France.  He represents the Deux-Sèvres department,  and is a member of the Socialiste, radical, citoyen et divers gauche.

References

1947 births
Living people
People from Deux-Sèvres
Socialist Party (France) politicians
Deputies of the 13th National Assembly of the French Fifth Republic
Deputies of the 14th National Assembly of the French Fifth Republic